Najash is an extinct genus of basal snake from the Late Cretaceous Candeleros Formation of Patagonia. Like a number of other Cretaceous and living snakes it retained hindlimbs, but Najash is unusual in having well-developed legs that extend outside the rib cage, and a pelvis connected to the spine.

Discovery and Description 
Fossils of Najash were found in the terrestrial Candeleros Formation, in Rio Negro Province, Argentina, and date to roughly 90 million years ago. The skull and spine of Najash show primitive features that resemble other Cretaceous snakes, such as Dinilysia patagonica and Madtsoiidae. Also, several characteristics of the neck and tail of Najash and Dinilysia patagonica show how the body plan of snakes evolved from a lizard-like ancestor.

Najash had not lost its sacrum, the pelvic bone composed of several fused vertebrae, nor its pelvic girdle, which are absent in modern snakes, and in all other known fossil snakes as well. Nearly all phylogenetic analyses place Najash as an early offshoot of the snake tree, outside of all living snakes.

See also 

 Madtsoiidae
 Dinilysia patagonica
 Candeleros Formation

References

External links
Pelvic region of a Najash fossil

Cretaceous snakes
Late Cretaceous reptiles of South America
Candeleros Formation
Fossil taxa described in 2006
Cretaceous Argentina